Zev Wolf is a Jewish name doublet. "Zev" means "wolf", and "Wolf" has the same meaning in Yiddish and German.

Zev Wolf may refer to:
Zev Wolf of Zbaraz (died 1822), Hasidic rabbi
Zev Wolf of Zhitomyr (died 1798), Hasidic rabbi
Zev Wolf Buchner (1750-1820), Hebrew-language grammarian and poet
Zev Wolf Gold (1889–1956), rabbi and Jewish activist
Zev Wolf Kitzes (born c. 1685, died between 1764-1775), Hasidic rabbi

See also 

Ze'ev
Wolf (disambiguation)